"Everybody Needs a Little Help" was the third and final single from Shannon Noll's third album, Turn It Up. It was released as a radio-only single on 4 February 2008. 
The track reached number one on the Australian Airplay Chart. A physical release was scheduled to be released, but, similarly to Noll's previous radio single, New Beginning, this plan was set aside. The reasoning lay in the impending release of Noll's first compilation album, No Turning Back: The Story So Far.

Video
A video was to be shot in early February 2008, but was cancelled after Sony BMG made the decision to focus on new material being released later in the year.

Track listing
Promo Single:
"Everybody Needs a Little Help" - 3:34

Chart Positioning

References

2008 singles
Shannon Noll songs
Songs written by Shannon Noll
Songs written by Steve McEwan
2007 songs
Sony BMG singles